Rockstone Pond is a settlement located in Belize. It is a mainland village located in Belize District, near the Mayan site of Altun Ha.

Populated places in Belize District
Belize Rural North